Som sendt fra himlen is a 1951 Danish comedy film directed by Johan Jacobsen.

Cast
Mogens Wieth as Allan / Alfred Kragh
Birgitte Reimer as Laura Heiberg
Kjeld Petersen as Torsten Vinge
Erik Mørk as Herbert Thorsen
Johannes Meyer as Kommandanten
Nina Kalckar as Fru Nina Heiberg
Svend Bille as Villy Edward Heiberg
Minna Jørgensen as Fru Nissen, husholderske
Osvald Helmuth as Jonas Møller
Henrik Wiehe as Præst
Dirch Passer as Soldat
John Wittig as Præst
Miskow Makwarth as Taxachauffør
Jørgen Weel as Spejderfører

External links

1951 films
1950s Danish-language films
1951 comedy films
Danish black-and-white films
Films directed by Johan Jacobsen
Danish comedy films